Braulio (585 – 651 AD) was bishop of Zaragoza and a learned cleric living in the Kingdom of the Visigoths.

Life
Braulio was born of a noble Hispano-Roman family. His father was Bishop of Osma. In 610 Braulio became a monk, and later studied under Isidore at Seville. Archbishop Isidore used education to counteract increasingly influential Gothic barbarism in his jurisdiction. Braulio was ordained by Isadore in 624. In 625 Braulio returned to Zaragoza where his brother John was then bishop, and served as his archdeacon. Upon his brother's death in 631, Braulio succeeded him as bishop. Known for almsgiving and preaching, he was an advisor and confidant of several Visigoth kings, including Chindasuinth, whose son Recceswinth he recommended be installed as associate king.

Braulio worked with Isidore to convert the Visigoths from Arianism. He is reported to have encouraged Isidore of Seville in his encyclopaedic ambitions, and to have had a hand in the revision of his works. Bishop Braulio, to whom Isidore dedicated it and sent it for correction, divided it into its twenty books. Braulio called it , "practically everything that it is necessary to know".

He was present at the councils of Toledo in 633, 636, and 638 and he responded on behalf of the Iberian clergy to Pope Honorius I's charge that they were neglectful of their duties. He wrote a life of San Millan.  Towards the end of his life, he lost his eyesight. He was buried in what is now the church of Nuestra Señora del Pilar in Zaragoza.  He was succeeded as bishop of Zaragoza by Taius (Taio), who had been his pupil.

He is buried in La Seo Cathedral, Zaragoza, and is the patron saint of Aragon and of the University of Zaragoza.

References

Sources
 Thompson, E. A. The Goths in Spain. Clarendon Press: Oxford, 1969.
 Iberian Fathers Writings of Braulio of Saragossa, Fructuosus of Braga, translated by Claude W. Barlow. Catholic University of America Press (1969)

External links

1601 Editio princeps of Braulio's Life of Emilian

590 births
651 deaths
7th-century bishops in the Visigothic Kingdom
People from Zaragoza
7th-century Christian saints
7th-century Latin writers
7th-century jurists